The Bloody Paniai case was a mass shooting by the Indonesian army from  of Korem 173/Praja Vira Braja of Kodam XVII/Cendrawasih which killed four teenagers and wounded of 17 others in Paniai Regency, Central Papua, Indonesia on 8 December 2014.

Events
On the night of 7 December 2014, Yulianus Yeimo (aged 14) and three of his friends in Ipakiye village criticised an Indonesian military officer for driving his motorcycle without headlights. The officer later returned to the location with four soldiers of 753rd Special Raider Infantry Battalion and violently beat the youth. Yeimo suffered severe head injuries and fell into a coma. The next day, people from the village of Eneratoli, Paniai Regency protested against the torturing of Yeimo and several of his friends. The following day, about 1,000 young men, women and children gathered at a football field in Paniai to peacefully protest against the behaviour of the army personnel when the security forces opened fire at them, killing four boys and injuring 17 others. According to Time, based on an official document an order was sent to the soldiers through internal radio: “If the masses offer resistance more than three times, shoot them dead”.

Aftermath
President Joko Widodo, who had just entered office in 2014 ordered the National Commission on Human Rights (Komnas HAM) to investigate the matter. On February 19, 2020 Komnas HAM declared that the shootings were a "gross human rights violation", and further accused TNI and the Indonesian police of obstructing justice regarding the incident. Yulianus Yeimo passed away in April 2018.

See also
Human rights in Indonesia
2019 Papua protests

References

Protests in Indonesia
Papua conflict
History of Central Papua
Massacres in Indonesia
2014 in Indonesia